Northern Border (Spanish: Frontera norte) is a 1953 Mexican crime film directed by Vicente Oroná and starring Fernando Fernández, Evangelina Elizondo, and Víctor Parra.

Cast
 Fernando Fernández as Carlos Gómez 
 Evangelina Elizondo as Rosaura  
 Víctor Parra as El baby  
 Dagoberto Rodríguez as Roberto Gómez  
 Gloria Mestre as Gloria  
 Arturo Martínez as Esbirro del baby  
 Raúl de Anda Jr. as Cato 
 Elisa Asperó as Sra. Gómez, madre de Carlos 
 Antonio Bravo as Abogado  
 Gilberto González as El Zurdo  
 Jaime Fernández as Jimmy 
 Federico Curiel as Detective policía  
 Roberto G. Rivera as Teodoro  
 Julio Sotelo as Comandante  
 María Gentil Arcos as Madre Lolita  
 Manuel Dondé 
 Jorge Arriaga as Ronco  
 Enrique del Castillo as Policía secreto  
 Agustín de Anda as Bolero / policía secreto 
 Lupe Carriles as Sirvienta en Tijuana  
 Manuel Casanueva as Jefe Durán  
 Arturo Cobo as Bailarín 
 Enedina Díaz de León as Sirvienta  
 Agustín Fernández as Esbirro del baby  
 Jaime González Quiñones as Pablito  
 Juan José Hurtado as Juan, contrabandista  
 José L. Murillo as Leo García, agente 19 
 José Muñoz as Comandante en Tijuana
 Roberto Y. Palacios as Wong Lee

References

Bibliography 
 Andrea Noble. Mexican National Cinema. Psychology Press, 2005.

External links 
 

1953 films
1953 crime films
Mexican crime films
1950s Spanish-language films
Films directed by Vicente Oroná
1950s Mexican films